Lviv bus station (also known as Stryiska bus station) is the main bus station of Lviv, in western Ukraine. The building is modernist in nature, and has a triangular floor plan.

The state decided to construct a new bus station for Lviv in 1969.  Planning began in 1971, and construction in 1976.  The station was opened in 1980.

Building 

The station was to be built near the southern entrance to the city.  The chosen plot had been previously populated with private houses; the residents were moved and the residences removed.

According to preliminary estimates, the building would cost 1,200,000SUR and the rest of the complex an additional 550,000SUR.  The station was to have a capacity of 500 passengers and the ability to handle up to 15,000 passengers daily.

The triangular floor plan split the building into three zones.  One side was to serve as the main façade facing Stryiska Street, a second as the arrival zone, and the third as the departure zone.  Currently, the arrival zone also serves as a departure zone, and the zone previously intended for departures is used for parking instead.

See also 
 Lviv Bus Factory
 Kyiv Central Bus Station

Notes

References 

Buildings and structures in Lviv
Bus stations in Ukraine
Transport in Lviv